Exyra ridingsii is a moth of the family Noctuidae. It is found from North Carolina to Florida and Alabama.

The wingspan is 24–31 mm. Adults are on wing in spring.

The larvae feed on Sarracenia flava and occasionally on Sarracenia minor.

References

External links
 Bug Guide

Plusiinae